Jason Owen is an American music manager and record executive, best known for launching artist management company Sandbox Entertainment and leading the careers of Shania Twain, Kacey Musgraves, Faith Hill,  Little Big Town, Dan+Shay, and Kelsea Ballerini among others. In 2015, Owen was named one of Billboard's “40 Under 40: Music’s Top Young Power Players”, and has since been included twice in the trade magazine's "Power 100" industry ranking.

Early life
Owen grew up in Monticello, Arkansas, where his father ran a chemical distribution company. He was inspired by the first concert he attended by The Judds at an early age, and was a fan of Madonna, Cher, Bette Midler, and Dolly Parton during his childhood. He attended college at the University of Arkansas.

Career

Film and television industry
After graduating from University of Arkansas, Owen held several roles within the film and television industry in Los Angeles and New York. He first worked for New Line Cinema and Fine Line Features in a publicity and talent relations position before moving to Spelling Entertainment, where he worked for television producer Aaron Spelling as manager of talent relations. He also served as director of marketing and talent relations for Columbia TriStar Television, where he oversaw press strategies for shows including Dawson's Creek, Ricki Lake, and The Young and the Restless.

Universal Music Nashville
Owen joined Universal Music Group Nashville, Universal Music Group's country music subsidiary, in 2002. In 2005 he was promoted from vice president to senior vice president of artist, media relations, and creative services, which involved responsibilities with record labels DreamWorks Nashville, MCA Nashville, and Mercury Nashville. In this Role, Owen helped launch careers for artists such as Sugarland, Julianne Hough, and Josh Turner. He then rose to senior vice president of artist development and marketing in March 2009, where he developed campaigns for Shania Twain, George Strait, Lee Ann Womack, and Reba McEntire.

Sandbox Entertainment
In August 2010, Owen stepped down from his role at Universal Music Nashville to launch artist management company Sandbox Entertainment. He opened the company in September 2010, with Shania Twain as his first management client after working with her for 8 years with Universal. Owen remained connected to Universal Music Nashville by serving in a consultancy role with then chairman & CEO Luke Lewis. Sandbox was initially formed with a publicity, marketing, and creative focus, but has since grown to include a touring division and a digital marketing department. Since opening its doors, Sandbox and Owen have added a number of formidable country music acts to its roster including Kacey Musgraves, Little Big Town, Faith Hill, Dan + Shay (co-managed by Scooter Braun), Midland, and Kelsea Ballerini.

In 2017, Owen arranged for Kacey Musgraves to open for Harry Styles on 20 dates of his US his summer tour. He also established the first yearlong residency at the Ryman Auditorium dubbed "Little Big Town at the Mother Church", during which Little Big Town played a number of shows at the celebrated venue and sold more than 23,000 tickets in total.

In 2018, Owen was named Executive of the Year on Billboard Magazine's 2018 Country Power Players List, ranking "movers, shakers, and influencers" within country music.

In 2019, Owen's clients Kacey Musgraves and Dan + Shay collectively won 5 awards at the Grammys, including all country music categories as well as Album of the Year for Musgraves. Variety named Owen their Hitmakers Manager of the Year in December.

Owen's executive producer credits include the Amazon Prime Video holiday variety special The Kacey Musgraves Show, the syndicated daytime show Pickler & Ben, the Showtime tour documentary Tim & Faith: Soul2Soul, the Food Network's Kimberly’s Simply Southern, the ABC concert special Shania: Still the One Live from Vegas,.. Fox TV series; Monarch, starring Susan Sarandon, set in the world of country music. Love,Tom; a storytelling documentary on Paramount+, CMT's A River of Time:Naomi Judd Memorial, and COAL MINER’S DAUGHTER: A celebration of the life & music of LORETTA LYNN.

Additionally, he has been an Executive Producer for 2021and 2022, CMT Music Awards.

Monument Records
In 2017,  Owen partnered with award-winning producer and songwriter Shane McAnally to revive Monument Records, an imprint of Sony Music Entertainment known in its past iterations for signing Kris Kristofferson, Dolly Parton, Roy Orbison, Willie Nelson, and the Dixie Chicks. Their first signings included Caitlyn Smith and Walker Hayes, but their roster has since grown to include Brandon Ratcliff, Teddy Robb, Anna Moon, and a podcast with music industry veterans Susan Nadler and Evelyn Shriver, coined “Shady Ladies of Music City”.

Awards and nominations

Daytime Emmy Awards

Personal life
Owen is openly gay and is married to Sam Easley, owner of Nashville based artist merchandising company Crown Merchandise. Together they have three children. He and his husband are avid art collectors, and in May 2018 together they guest-curated a photography exhibition titled "Vestige" at David Lusk Gallery in Nashville showcasing works from their photography collection.

References

External links 
 Sandbox Entertainment
 Monument Records

American music industry executives
Universal Music Group
American talent agents
Living people
Year of birth missing (living people)